The Western Carolina Catamounts women's basketball team is the basketball team that represents Western Carolina University in Cullowhee, North Carolina, United States. The school's team currently competes in the Southern Conference.

History
The Catamonts began play in 1965. They joined Division I in 1981. In their two NCAA Tournament appearances, they have lost in the First Round both times. In 2005, they lost 94–43 to Tennessee. In 2009, they lost 73–44 to Vanderbilt. In 2007, they were invited to the WNIT after winning a share of the regular season title with Chattanooga, where they lost 74–64 to Virginia Tech in Round 2.

NCAA tournament results
The Catamounts have appeared in two NCAA Tournaments, with a combined record of 0–2.

References

External links